Annie Shekhar ( – 2 October 2022) was an Indian politician who was a senior member of the Indian National Congress.

Career
She was first elected as president of Colaba Mahila Congress and later as the General Secretary of the M.R.C.C. She was a two term municipal corporator at the BMC, and later a two term member of the Maharashtra Legislative Assembly, representing the Colaba constituency. From 2006-09, she served as Chairperson of the Children's Aid Society with the rank of minister of state.

Positions held 
Maharashtra Legislative Assembly MLA (2004-2009; 2009-2014).

Death
Shekhar died on 2 October 2022, aged 84.

References 

1930s births
Year of birth missing
2022 deaths
Marathi politicians
Maharashtra MLAs 2004–2009
Maharashtra MLAs 2009–2014
Indian National Congress politicians from Maharashtra
21st-century Indian women politicians
People from Mumbai City district
Women members of the Maharashtra Legislative Assembly